L'Argentière-la-Bessée is a commune of the Hautes-Alpes department in the Alps in southeastern France.

The town lies on the River Durance, which is used for kayaking, white-water rafting and other water sports. The Argentiere Canoe Slalom Course is in the Durance River south of the town.  The town is located on the edge of the Écrins National Park. There is an SNCF station in the town with trains running to Briançon and Paris. The village has an old silver mine (which is where the name of L'Argentière derived from), which is now opened to tourists.

Population

See also

 Écrins National Park
 Durance
Communes of the Hautes-Alpes department

References

External links
 Official Web site 
 L'Argentiere-la-Bessee - Description in French and pictures

Communes of Hautes-Alpes